Itapiranga is a municipality located in the state of Amazonas northern Brazil on the left bank of the Solimões River about 200 km east of Manaus. Its population was 9,230 (2020) and its area is 4,231 km².

The name is of Indian origin, and was given to a quarry which has a port.  It comes from ita, stone and pitanga, red, so the name means "red stone".

The municipality contains about 40% of the  Uatumã Sustainable Development Reserve, which protects the lower part of the Uatumã River basin.

History
It was founded in 1931 as a suburb of Silves.

References

Municipalities in Amazonas (Brazilian state)
Populated places on the Amazon